Satyendar Kumar Jain is an Indian politician who was the Cabinet Minister in the Government of Delhi and from the Aam Aadmi Party. 
He was the former cabinet minister in the Government of Delhi led by Arvind Kejriwal. 
His portfolios included Health & Family Welfare, Industries, Home, Power, Water, Urban Development and Irrigation & flood Control. He served three terms as the Delhi Health Minister. In his First tenure he served as Health & Family welfare, Gurudwara Elections and Industries Minister from 28 December 2013 to 14 February 2014 and, In his Second tenure he served as Health & Family Welfare, Industries, Home, PWD, Power, Water, Transport, Urban Development and Irrigation & Flood Control from 14 February to 13 February 2020 in the previous AAP Governments. Jain is an architect by profession.

Jain was arrested by the Enforcement Directorate in May 2022 based on the allegations on money laundering, 9 months after which he submitted his resignation for the portfolios he held as a minister in February 2023.

Early life
Satyendra Jain was born in Village Kirthal, District Baghpat, Uttar Pradesh. He did his schooling from Ramjas School, No.2, Delhi and completed Graduation in Architecture from the Indian Institute of Architects.

Political career
Jain began his foray into politics after becoming involved with Anna Hazare's movement against corruption.

Prior to his involvement with politics Jain worked at the Central Public Works Department (CPWD), later quitting the job to set up an architectural consultancy firm. Jain has also been involved in work with social welfare organizations; he has been involved with Drishti, an organization working to help the visually impaired and SPARSH, an organization dedicated to the empowerment and welfare of the physically and mentally challenged. He served as Health & Family Welfare, Industries, Home, PWD, Power, Water, Urban Development and Irrigation & flood control.

Jain was arrested by Enforcement Directorate on 31 May 2022 for allegations of money laundering.

Member of Legislative Assembly

MLA first term (2013-2014)
In his first tenure as the Member of Legislative Assembly from Shakur Basti Assembly constituency, he served as Health & Family welfare, Gurudwara Elections and Industries Minister, in the First Kejriwal ministry from 28 December 2013 to 14 February 2014.

He is also said to be a close aide of Arvind Kejriwal.

MLA second term (2015-2020)
In his second term as MLA after winning the 2015 Assembly elections, he served in the Second Kejriwal ministry as Health & Family Welfare, Industries, Home, PWD, Power, Water, Transport, Urban Development and Irrigation & Flood control from 14 February to 13 February 2020.

In 2017, rebel MLA Kapil Mishra left AAP and joined BJP, he made accusations of bribery on Jain. In May 2017 Jain sued Mishra for criminal defamation. Kapil Mishra apologized for his accusations and defamation lawsuit was withdrawn. Later a lawyer used the accusation made by Mishra to file a complaint with the Delhi lokayukta for investigation, no evidence was submitted by the complainant. After the investigation, the Delhi Lokayukta did not find any evidence to support the accusations of bribery and fined the complainant a sum of ₹50,000.

MLA third term (2020-present)
Jain was re-elected for the third time in a row from Shakur Basti Assembly Constituency with a margin of 7,592 votes in the 2020 Assembly elections.  He is currently in his third term as Delhi Health Minister in the Third Kejriwal ministry. He is presently serving as Minister of Health & Family Welfare, Industries, Home, PWD, Power, Water, Urban Development and Irrigation & flood control, Government of NCT of Delhi.

In 2022, Jain was appointed in charge of the Assembly election in Himachal Pradesh.

Jain has been accused by the Enforcement Directorate of money laundering after CBI filed a case in 2017. Jain was questioned in 2018 after which there was no major progress in the case.

In early 2022, AAP leader Arvind Kejriwal stated that he had information from sources that government agencies were planning to arrest Jain just before the 2022 Punjab Legislative Assembly election. AAP won the Punjab elections. Jain had stated, "They (ED) are welcome to come whenever they want. Even before this, they have raided me twice but all has been in vain. This is all politics and they did it during the last Punjab elections also. ED, CBI all are welcome. I am ready, if they want to arrest me, they can arrest me." In May 2022, ED arrested him in the 2017 case. Delhi deputy chief minister Manish Sisodia condemned the arrest and called it a fake case.

On 10 October 2022, the Delhi High Court closed all ongoing legal proceedings against Satyendar Jain under the Benami Transaction (Prohibition) Amendment Act. The decision was made after Jain appealed for the same in the High Court in 2017. The said transactions were made between 2011 and March 2016. The laws under which Jain was charged came into effect in November 2016, so they did not apply in his case.

Cabinet Minister, Delhi
He is a cabinet minister in the Third Kejriwal ministry and holds the charge of below listed departments of the Government of Delhi.
 Home
 Health
 Public Works Department
 Power
 Water
 Industries
 Urban development
 Irrigation
 Flood Control 
 Labour
 Employment

Personal life
Jain lived with his family in Saraswati Vihar in North West Delhi, and now lives in a government bungalow in Civil lines. His father was a retired teacher who moved to Delhi after Jain's birth from his hometown Kirthal in Baghpat tehsil, in the state of Uttar Pradesh.

On 17 June 2020, Jain tested positive for COVID-19.

In June 2020, all Jain's departments were temporarily taken over by the Deputy C.M. Manish Sisodia, citing his health issues as he himself was battling the COVID-19 virus. However, Jain retained the status of a minister without any department.

Earlier, Jain travelled from one hospital to another and was keeping a close look on the circumstances and developments in the hospitals while treating COVID patients.

On 20 June 2020 he was administered plasma therapy at the hospital in Saket, and on 24 June it was reported that his condition had improved considerably. On 2 May 2021 his father died due to COVID-19.

Electoral performance

References 

Living people
Delhi MLAs 2013–2015
Delhi MLAs 2015–2020
Delhi MLAs 2020–2025
1964 births
Aam Aadmi Party MLAs from Delhi
Prisoners and detainees of India